Maya Bejerano (born 1949 Kibbutz Eilon) is an Israeli poet.

She graduated from Bar-Ilan University with a B.A. in Literature and Philosophy, and from Hebrew University with an M.A. in Library Sciences. She won a 2010 ACUM literary award, and is a three-time recipient of the Prime Minister's Prize for Hebrew Literary Works (1986, 1994, 1996). In 2002 she was awarded the Bialik Prize.

Works
Bat Ya`ana (Ostrich), Achshav, 1978  
Ha-Hom Ve-Ha-Kor (The Heat and the Cold), Alef, 1981   
Ibud Netunim 52 (Data Processing 52), Alef, 1983   
Shirat ha-Tziporim (The Song of the Birds), Achshav, 1985   
Kol (Voice), Siman Kriah/Hakibbutz Hameuchad, 1987   
Retzef Ha-Shirim 1972-1986 (Selected Poems), Am Oved, 1987   
Leviatan (Whale), Hakibbutz Hameuchad, 1990   
Ha-Simla Ha-Kehula Ve-Sochen Ha-Bituach, (The Blue Dress and the Insurance Agent), stories & play, Keter, 1992 
Mizmorei Iyov (The Hymns of Job), Hakibbutz Hameuchad, 1993   
Ha-Perah Ha-Sakran (The Curious Flower) children, Yaron Golan, 1993   
Anaseh Laga`at Be-Tabur Bitni (Trying to Touch My Belly Button), Hakibbutz Hameuchad, 1998 
Tedarim (Frequencies), Hakibbutz Hameuchad, 2005  
Madrich Taiarim Ba-Ir Zara (A Tour Guide in a Foreign City) stories, Carmel, 2007   
Hitorarti be- Merkazu sel Ha- Alachsun (Waking at the Heart of the Diagonal), Hakibbutz Hameuchad, 2009

Books in English
The Hymns of Job and Other Poems, Translator Tsipi Keller, Rochester, NY: BOA Editions, 2008,

Anthologies

References

1949 births
20th-century Israeli poets
Hebrew-language poets
Living people
21st-century Israeli poets
Bar-Ilan University alumni
Hebrew University of Jerusalem alumni
Israeli women poets
21st-century Israeli women writers
20th-century Israeli women writers
Recipients of Prime Minister's Prize for Hebrew Literary Works